Alfred Hughes may refer to:
Alfred Hughes (sailor) (1868–1935), British Olympic sailor
Alfred Clifton Hughes (born 1932), retired American prelate of the Roman Catholic Church, Archbishop of New Orleans 2002-2009
Sir Alfred Hughes, 9th Baronet (1825–1898), of the Hughes baronets
Alf Hughes (1930–2019), Australian rules footballer
Alfred W Hughes, served as a surgeon in the Second Boer War, see Hughes Memorial, Corris